Grant Radnor Dodwell (born 2 July 1952, in Sydney) is an Australian actor, producer, writer, director, voice artist, and drama teacher. He is a triple recipient of the Silver Logie for Most Popular Actor. He is best known for his roles in television soap operas including as an original cast member in A Country Practice, Willing and Abel and Home and Away.

Career 
Dodwell has more than 40 years' experience in the entertainment industry in theatre, television and film appearing in many of Australia's best known stage shows and television series. He is best known for his Logie award-winning television acting role playing Dr. Simon Bowen in A Country Practice. He would later play Charles Willing in Willing and Abel (1987) in which he co-starred with his former ACP co-star Shane Withington who played the role of Abel Moore. He also appeared as Dr. Sam Wilkinson in Home & Away during its later years.

Dodwell worked on 2008 feature film Men's Group, produced by John L. Simpson and directed by Michael Joy. He won the Australian IF best actor award and the film won Best Film and Script.

Filmography

Awards

External links

References

1952 births
20th-century Australian male actors
21st-century Australian male actors
Australian male film actors
Australian male television actors
Drama teachers
Living people
Logie Award winners
Male actors from Sydney